Montiano is a comune (municipality) in the Province of Forlì-Cesena in the Italian region Emilia-Romagna, located about  southeast of Bologna and about  southeast of Forlì.

The municipality of Montiano contains the frazioni (subdivisions, mainly villages and hamlets) Badia and Montenovo.

Montiano borders the following municipalities: Cesena, Longiano, Roncofreddo.

Demographic evolution

References

External links
 www.comune.montiano.fc.it/

Cities and towns in Emilia-Romagna